Plinia is a genus of flowering plants in the myrtle family, Myrtaceae described by Linnaeus in 1753. It is native to Central and South America as well as the West Indies.

Species

References

External links
 
 

 
Myrtaceae genera
Neotropical realm flora